Athikkottai is a village located 3 km from Pattukkottai town in Thanjavur district in Tamil Nadu state in India, en route to pattukottai via Madukkur.It is one of 36 villages of the Musugundan Community.

Most of the people are well educated and very rich. There are many streets and each street is having their own family god. Some people from middle street are settled in various cities. 

And most of the people are settled in SIngapore, London and some other countries. Main occupation of the people of athikkottai is Agriculture. In this village, Paddy cultivation, Sugarcane and Coconut trees are the major crops. 

Villages in Thanjavur district